Zmarak Khan Achakzai is a Pakistani politician who is the current Provincial Minister of Balochistan for Agriculture and Cooperatives, in office since 30 August 2018. He has been a member of the Provincial Assembly of Balochistan since August 2018. Previously he was a Member of the Provincial Assembly of Balochistan from May 2013 to May 2018.

Early life and education

He was born on 14 August 1962 in Killa Abdullah District.

He has a degree in Bachelor of Engineering.

Political career

He was elected to the Provincial Assembly of Balochistan as a candidate of Awami National Party (ANP) from Constituency PB-12 Killa Abdullah-II in 2013 Pakistani general election.

He was re-elected to the Provincial Assembly of Balochistan as a candidate of ANP from Constituency PB-21 (Killa Abdullah-I) in 2018 Pakistani general election.

On 27 August 2018, he was inducted into the provincial Balochistan cabinet of Chief Minister Jam Kamal Khan. On 30 August, he was appointed as Provincial Minister of Balochistan for Agriculture and cooperatives.

References

Living people
Balochistan MPAs 2013–2018
1962 births
Awami National Party MPAs (Balochistan)